Wajid Iltaf Khan, Baron Khan of Burnley (born 15 October 1979), is a British-Pakistani Labour Party politician who served as a Member of the European Parliament (MEP) for North West England from 2017 to 2019 and as Mayor of Burnley from 2020 to 2021.

He sat on the Foreign Affairs Committee and Human Rights Committee, as well as the Arab Peninsula and South Asia delegations. His main policy interests include workers’ rights, youth empowerment and human rights.

In December 2020, it was announced he would be conferred a life peerage after a nomination by Labour Party Leader Keir Starmer.

Early life 
The son of a taxi driver and a house-wife, Wajid was born in Burnley, Lancashire, where he continues to live with his wife and two children. Wajid has served as a Labour councillor and Burnley Council cabinet member.

Before becoming an MEP, Wajid was a senior lecturer at the University of Central Lancashire for 12 years, and a course leader in community leadership for 11 years.

Prior to this, Wajid worked in the voluntary sector with young offenders, as well as teaching education programmes for homeless young people. The Burnley race riots in 2001 inspired Wajid to develop a number of community cohesion projects, which gained him the Higher Education Active Community Fund (HEACF) Volunteering Award for social and community cohesion in 2004.

Wajid's work in community development has seen him address the Civil G8 on inclusive education in Moscow, and advised the Russian Ministry of Education and Science on developing youth strategies.

He has contributed to European-wide ‘Volunteurope’ conferences in Germany, France, Poland, Bosnia and Italy.

Within the UK, Wajid has developed higher education programmes to increase academic participation amongst women in the south Asian community.  Wajid has directed international leadership conferences in Oman, Turkey, Pakistan and the US, and has represented the University of Central Lancashire in collaborative projects with Russian NGOs.

Wajid is an alumnus of both of HRH Prince Charles' leadership initiatives: the Mosaic international Leadership Programme as well as the Oxford Young Muslim Leadership Programme.

He also serves on the Labour Party National Policy Forum and International Policy Commission, in addition to serving on the North West regional board.

MEP 
Khan was included in Labour's eight-person shortlist for the 2014 European Parliament election.
He took over the North West England seat in July 2017, replacing Afzal Khan who was elected as a Member of Parliament in the general election. He lost his seat in the 2019 European Parliament election.

References 

1979 births
Living people
Labour Party (UK) MEPs
MEPs for England 2014–2019
Labour Party (UK) life peers
People from Burnley
British politicians of Pakistani descent
Life peers created by Elizabeth II